The Bad Seed is a 1985 American made-for-television horror film directed by Paul Wendkos for ABC Television. It is based on the 1954 novel by William March and is a remake of the 1956 movie directed by Mervyn LeRoy.

Synopsis
Freak fatal accidents force a widow to realize her precocious 9-year-old daughter was born to kill.

Plot

Rachel Penmark is a young girl who is upset at not winning a penmanship medal at school, having lost to her classmate Mark Daigler. During a school trip to the beach, Rachel tries to get Mark to give her the medal, he refuses and she chases him onto a fishing pier.

Teacher Alice Fern, notices Mark is missing during a roll call. They organize into search teams to look for him. When he is found, unsuccessful attempts are made to revive him on the shore near the pier, and the death is ruled as an accidental drowning.

Rachel's mother, Christine Penmark, is discussing all of the deaths Rachel has seen with neighbors Monica and Emory Breedlove. Rachel saw the TV news reports about her father's death. Christine recalls the death of a neighbor, Mrs. Post, who adored Rachel, in an accidental fall down some stairs. Christine worries when Rachel appears to be unaffected by Mark's death. Monica and Emory assure her that this is normal because children have a defense mechanism to process these things.

Christine asks Emory about a book he is writing about a female serial killer. Emory mentions a name and case of a serial killer, Bessie Danker, that Christine's father, Richard Bravo, worked on years earlier and the name seems to resonate with Christine. Rachel is outside playing when the maintenance man, Leroy Jessup, mentions that she does not seem sorry about Mark's death, to which she replies, "Why should I feel sorry? He's the one that's dead."

Christine goes to meet with Ms. Fern to discuss something important. Ms. Fern says that Rachel may finish out the remainder of the current school term, but that she will not be welcomed back next semester to The Fern Academy due to concerns about her behavior. Ms. Fern says others witnessed Rachel arguing with Mark, and that he was last seen running from her. Rachel denied this, and Ms. Fern thinks Rachel deliberately lied. Ms. Fern says the penmanship medal was missing. Rachel insists she did not take the medal, but admits she lied to Ms. Fern because she did not want to be blamed.

When they get home, Mark's parents, Rita and Fred Daigler, are waiting to talk with them. Rita knows Rachel was the last person to see Mark alive and she is looking for the medal. Rachel goes out to play and Christine invites The Daiglers to come inside for coffee. Rita is desperate to find the medal, because of the significance to Mark that winning it was. Christine apologizes, but is adamant that she and Rachel do not know where it is. As the Daiglers leave, Rita mentions the bruises on Mark's body.

Monica comes by to get the locket she'd given Rachel as a gift so that she can take it to the jeweller to have the gemstone changed for her. Christine is horrified to find the penmanship medal while looking for the locket. She confronts Rachel about it, and she admits that she lied. She says she asked Mark if she could see the medal, and he said no. She offered him money to let her carry it around, and he agreed. She says she lied because she thought people would think she stole it.
 
Rachel is outside playing when Leroy brings up his theory about her killing Mark. She counters his attack by bringing up things she knows about him and they threaten each other with info that could be used as blackmail.

Christine considers whether a lack of morality can be hereditary.  Later, Christine has a nightmare that she is a little girl who is being chased through a cornfield by a woman, Bessie Danker, with a knife. She awakens and realizes she is related to Bessie Danker because she is called by "Christine Danker". The next day, Richard confirms that the details of Christine's recurring nightmare are actually a true memories, and they adopted her after Bessie was arrested. They did not tell her about it because they thought she was too young to remember, and Christine worries that Rachel may have inherited psychopathy from Bessie.
 
Rachel is playing when Leroy provokes her into argument. He mentions that trace evidence can be found even if someone tries to wash it away and that there is an electric chair for children. She thinks he is lying until he calls Emory over to verify that some things Leroy mentioned are true.

Christine catches Rachel trying to dispose of her shoes. She realizes they were used in Mark's killing because of the bruises he had. Leroy lies to Rachel by telling her he got her shoes out of the incinerator before they burned up. He becomes her next victim when she locks him into a shed and sets it on fire. Christine attempts a murder-suicide by giving Rachel an overdose of sleeping pills, and shooting herself with a revolver. Rachel survives and goes to live with Richard.

Cast

Major characters
 Blair Brown as Christine Penmark
 Lynn Redgrave as Monica Breedlove 
 David Carradine as Leroy Jessup  
 Carrie Wells as Rachel Penmark 
 Richard Kiley as Richard Bravo 
 David Ogden Stiers as Emory Breedlove
 Chad Allen as Mark Daigler

Minor characters
 Eve Smith as Mrs. Post 
 Carol Locatell as Rita Daigler
 Weldon Bleiler as Fred Daigler
 Anne Haney as Alice Fern
 Rebecca Birken as young Christine Danker

References

External links
 

1985 television films
1985 films
1985 horror films
ABC network original films
American horror television films
Remakes of American films
Juvenile delinquency in fiction
Films about children
Films about child death
Horror film remakes
Films directed by Paul Wendkos
The Bad Seed
1980s English-language films
1980s American films

ja:悪い種子#1985年版